William Desmond McGrath (3 December 1936 – 22 August 2018) was an Australian politician who was a member of National Party. He was also a professional Australian rules footballer.

McGrath played in the Victorian Football League with South Melbourne, under captain-coach Ron Clegg. He played 15 out of a possible 18 games in the 1959 home and away season. He also kicked 18 goals, including five in a win over Richmond at Punt Road, with team-mate Bob Skilton matching his tally. At the end of the year he returned to his family farm in Minyip but would continue to play and later coach in the Wimmera Football League.

In the 1979 state election, McGrath became the member for Lowan in the Victorian Legislative Assembly, and then the member for Wimmera in 1992, following a redistribution. In his fourth term he was appointed Shadow Minister for Agriculture, and after being re-elected in 1992 for a fifth time, he became the Minister for Agriculture. He served in that position until 1996, when he was named Minister for Corrections and Minister for Police and Emergency Services, retaining those portfolios until his retirement in 1999. He was replaced in his seat by Hugh Delahunty, another former VFL player.

McGrath died 22 August 2018 aged 81.

References

External links

Victorian Parliament: McGrath, William Desmond
 Victorian Government Hansard of November 1990, pp.2208-2218: Victorian Legislative Assembly's debate on the Collingwood (Victoria Park) Land Bill on 21 November 1990: features an informative interchange between Murray Weideman's older brother, Graeme Weideman, and former South Melbourne footballer, Bill McGrath, both of whom were MLAs at the time.

|-

1936 births
2018 deaths
National Party of Australia members of the Parliament of Victoria
Members of the Victorian Legislative Assembly
Victoria (Australia) state politicians
Australian sportsperson-politicians
Sydney Swans players
Minyip Football Club players
Australian rules footballers from Victoria (Australia)
Victorian Ministers for Agriculture